Les Llosses is a village in the province of Girona and autonomous community of Catalonia, Spain. It includes an exclave within Borredà.

References

External links
 Government data pages 

Municipalities in Ripollès